Callinicus V (dates of birth and death unknown) was Ecumenical Patriarch of Constantinople from 1801 to 1806 and 1808 to 1809. He was Metropolitan bishop of Adrianople (modern Edirne) (1780–1792) and Nicaea (1792–1801).

References

Bibliography
И. И. Соколов. Константинопольская церковь въ XIX вѣкѣ. Опытъ историческаго изслѣдованія. Т. I, СПб., 1904.

External links
Οικουμενικό Πατριαρχείο
Εγκυκλοπαίδεια «Υδρία», 1984, τόμος 30, σελίδα 173
Εγκυκλοπαίδεια Μείζονος Ελληνισμού

Bishops of Nicaea
Bishops of Adrianople
18th-century Greek people
19th-century Greek people
19th-century Ecumenical Patriarchs of Constantinople
1809 deaths
People from Mudanya